Awni Yousif was an Iraqi Kurdish politician and lawyer born in 1908. Awni Yousif served as a judge at the Kirkuk Court of Cassation. He was appointed Minister of Works and Housing in Abd al-Karim Qasim's cabinet in mid-July 1959.

References

Iraqi politicians